Maribor Castle is a Baroque mansion in the town of Maribor, northeastern Slovenia. It contains a regional museum.

Lordship Maribor 
During the Middle Ages, the old and new built castle belonged to the important Lordship Maribor. The following list shows the Lord's of Maribor.

External links

Castles in Styria (Slovenia)
Mansions in Slovenia
Buildings and structures in Maribor
Castle